The Sterlitamak constituency (No.8) is a Russian legislative constituency in Bashkortostan. The constituency covers south-central Bashkiria and anchors in Sterlitamak.

Members elected

Election results

1993

|-
! colspan=2 style="background-color:#E9E9E9;text-align:left;vertical-align:top;" |Candidate
! style="background-color:#E9E9E9;text-align:left;vertical-align:top;" |Party
! style="background-color:#E9E9E9;text-align:right;" |Votes
! style="background-color:#E9E9E9;text-align:right;" |%
|-
|style="background-color:"|
|align=left|Yury Utkin
|align=left|Independent
|
|44.05%
|-
|style="background-color:"|
|align=left|Grigory Rutman
|align=left|Independent
| -
|14.45%
|-
| colspan="5" style="background-color:#E9E9E9;"|
|- style="font-weight:bold"
| colspan="3" style="text-align:left;" | Total
| 
| 100%
|-
| colspan="5" style="background-color:#E9E9E9;"|
|- style="font-weight:bold"
| colspan="4" |Source:
|
|}

1995

|-
! colspan=2 style="background-color:#E9E9E9;text-align:left;vertical-align:top;" |Candidate
! style="background-color:#E9E9E9;text-align:left;vertical-align:top;" |Party
! style="background-color:#E9E9E9;text-align:right;" |Votes
! style="background-color:#E9E9E9;text-align:right;" |%
|-
|style="background-color:"|
|align=left|Yury Utkin (incumbent)
|align=left|Independent
|
|51.27%
|-
|style="background-color:#E98282"|
|align=left|Svetlana Pronina
|align=left|Women of Russia
|
|20.16%
|-
|style="background-color:"|
|align=left|Shamil Mingaleyev
|align=left|Independent
|
|8.24%
|-
|style="background-color:"|
|align=left|Vilkim Maksyutov
|align=left|Independent
|
|7.05%
|-
|style="background-color:"|
|align=left|Aleksey Kirillov
|align=left|Independent
|
|3.07%
|-
|style="background-color:"|
|align=left|Vyacheslav Petrov
|align=left|Liberal Democratic Party
|
|2.93%
|-
|style="background-color:#000000"|
|colspan=2 |against all
|
|6.03%
|-
| colspan="5" style="background-color:#E9E9E9;"|
|- style="font-weight:bold"
| colspan="3" style="text-align:left;" | Total
| 
| 100%
|-
| colspan="5" style="background-color:#E9E9E9;"|
|- style="font-weight:bold"
| colspan="4" |Source:
|
|}

1999

|-
! colspan=2 style="background-color:#E9E9E9;text-align:left;vertical-align:top;" |Candidate
! style="background-color:#E9E9E9;text-align:left;vertical-align:top;" |Party
! style="background-color:#E9E9E9;text-align:right;" |Votes
! style="background-color:#E9E9E9;text-align:right;" |%
|-
|style="background-color:"|
|align=left|Midkhat Khakimov
|align=left|Independent
|
|41.72%
|-
|style="background-color:"|
|align=left|Rashit Khuzhin
|align=left|Independent
|
|27.34%
|-
|style="background-color:"|
|align=left|Yury Utkin (incumbent)
|align=left|Independent
|
|10.15%
|-
|style="background-color:#D50000"|
|align=left|Aleksandr Ruban
|align=left|Communists and Workers of Russia - for the Soviet Union
|
|8.69%
|-
|style="background-color:"|
|align=left|Radik Kuramshin
|align=left|Our Home – Russia
|
|1.85%
|-
|style="background-color:#000000"|
|colspan=2 |against all
|
|8.94%
|-
| colspan="5" style="background-color:#E9E9E9;"|
|- style="font-weight:bold"
| colspan="3" style="text-align:left;" | Total
| 
| 100%
|-
| colspan="5" style="background-color:#E9E9E9;"|
|- style="font-weight:bold"
| colspan="4" |Source:
|
|}

2003

|-
! colspan=2 style="background-color:#E9E9E9;text-align:left;vertical-align:top;" |Candidate
! style="background-color:#E9E9E9;text-align:left;vertical-align:top;" |Party
! style="background-color:#E9E9E9;text-align:right;" |Votes
! style="background-color:#E9E9E9;text-align:right;" |%
|-
|style="background-color:"|
|align=left|Anatoly Starkov
|align=left|United Russia
|
|51.82%
|-
|style="background-color:"|
|align=left|Salavat Dautov
|align=left|Independent
|
|10.07%
|-
|style="background-color:"|
|align=left|Yury Medvedev
|align=left|Independent
|
|8.88%
|-
|style="background-color:"|
|align=left|Farit Minibayev
|align=left|Communist Party
|
|8.15%
|-
|style="background-color:"|
|align=left|Aleksey Aleksandrov
|align=left|Independent
|
|4.52%
|-
|style="background-color:#1042A5"|
|align=left|Robert Bikanasov
|align=left|Union of Right Forces
|
|2.39%
|-
|style="background-color:#7C73CC"|
|align=left|Farit Idrisov
|align=left|Great Russia – Eurasian Union
|
|1.36%
|-
|style="background-color:#164C8C"|
|align=left|Anton Gugengeymer
|align=left|United Russian Party Rus'
|
|0.46%
|-
|style="background-color:#000000"|
|colspan=2 |against all
|
|8.65%
|-
| colspan="5" style="background-color:#E9E9E9;"|
|- style="font-weight:bold"
| colspan="3" style="text-align:left;" | Total
| 
| 100%
|-
| colspan="5" style="background-color:#E9E9E9;"|
|- style="font-weight:bold"
| colspan="4" |Source:
|
|}

2016

|-
! colspan=2 style="background-color:#E9E9E9;text-align:left;vertical-align:top;" |Candidate
! style="background-color:#E9E9E9;text-align:leftt;vertical-align:top;" |Party
! style="background-color:#E9E9E9;text-align:right;" |Votes
! style="background-color:#E9E9E9;text-align:right;" |%
|-
| style="background-color: " |
|align=left|Aleksey Izotov
|align=left|United Russia
|
|47.85%
|-
|style="background-color:"|
|align=left|Vadim Starov
|align=left|Communist Party
|
|24.17%
|-
|style="background-color:"|
|align=left|Rufina Shagapova
|align=left|The Greens
|
|12.20%
|-
|style="background-color:"|
|align=left|Veronika Ananyeva
|align=left|Liberal Democratic Party
|
|4.71%
|-
|style="background-color:"|
|align=left|Yury Biryuzov
|align=left|Communists of Russia
|
|4.13%
|-
|style="background-color:"|
|align=left|Azamat Gubaidullin
|align=left|Party of Growth
|
|3.70%
|-
|style="background-color:"|
|align=left|Nurislam Usmanov
|align=left|Rodina
|
|2.65%
|-
| colspan="5" style="background-color:#E9E9E9;"|
|- style="font-weight:bold"
| colspan="3" style="text-align:left;" | Total
| 
| 100%
|-
| colspan="5" style="background-color:#E9E9E9;"|
|- style="font-weight:bold"
| colspan="4" |Source:
|
|}

2021

|-
! colspan=2 style="background-color:#E9E9E9;text-align:left;vertical-align:top;" |Candidate
! style="background-color:#E9E9E9;text-align:left;vertical-align:top;" |Party
! style="background-color:#E9E9E9;text-align:right;" |Votes
! style="background-color:#E9E9E9;text-align:right;" |%
|-
|style="background-color: " |
|align=left|Dinar Gilmutdinov
|align=left|United Russia
|
|53.78%
|-
|style="background-color:"|
|align=left|Vadim Iskandarov
|align=left|A Just Russia — For Truth
|
|14.00%
|-
|style="background-color:"|
|align=left|Gyuzel Yusupova
|align=left|Communist Party
|
|13.39%
|-
|style="background-color:"|
|align=left|Vyacheslav Ryabov
|align=left|Liberal Democratic Party
|
|4.86%
|-
|style="background-color: "|
|align=left|Ildar Iskhakov
|align=left|Party of Pensioners
|
|4.02%
|-
|style="background-color:"|
|align=left|Aigul Khabibrakhmanova
|align=left|New People
|
|3.68%
|-
|style="background-color:"|
|align=left|Vladimir Agafonov
|align=left|Rodina
|
|3.37%
|-
|style="background-color:"|
|align=left|Emil Shaimardanov
|align=left|Yabloko
|
|1.15%
|-
| colspan="5" style="background-color:#E9E9E9;"|
|- style="font-weight:bold"
| colspan="3" style="text-align:left;" | Total
| 
| 100%
|-
| colspan="5" style="background-color:#E9E9E9;"|
|- style="font-weight:bold"
| colspan="4" |Source:
|
|}

Notes

References 

Russian legislative constituencies
Politics of Bashkortostan